Alajuela is a district in the Alajuela canton of the Alajuela Province of Costa Rica. As the seat of the Municipality of Alajuela canton, it is awarded the status of city. By virtue of being the city of the first canton of the province, it is also the capital of the Province of Alajuela.

Because of its location in the Costa Rican Central Valley, Alajuela is nowadays part of the conurbation of the Greater Metropolitan Area. The city is the birthplace of Juan Santamaría, the national hero of Costa Rica and the figure who gives the name to the country's main international airport, which is south of Alajuela downtown.

Geography 
Alajuela has an area of  km2 and an elevation of  metres. It is located in the Central Valley, 19 kilometres northwest of San José.

Climate
The climate is tropical, typical of the Central Valley, but slightly warmer than San José. Temperatures are moderate, averaging 23–26 degrees Celsius with a low humidity level, with dewpoints around 20 almost all year round. Alajuela and its surroundings are famed for having "the best weather in the world".

Demographics 

For the 2011 census, Alajuela had a population of  inhabitants.

History

In pre-Columbian times the land where the canton of Alajuela is today was part of the Western Huetar Kingdom, which was inhabited by native tribes, who at the time of the Spanish conquest were led by Chief Garabito.

The first Spanish settlers established settlements in the region in about 1650. In a letter of obligation granted in 1864, the place is mentioned as La Lajuela in the Valley of Barva, near the Canoas river.

In 1777, the dwellers of La Lajuela and Ciruelas, having been served with notice to move to Villa Vieja (today's Heredia), requested the provisional construction of a public place of prayer in the house of Don Dionysius Oconitrillo, of Spanish origin, 30 metres north of where Alajuela's cathedral is today.

After increases of population in the five existing quarters then: Targuaz, Puás, Ciruelas, La Lajuela and Rio Grande, the citizens faced difficulties to maintain their religious obligations, so they requested permission to establish a parish and a public place of prayer from the Bishop of Nicaragua and Costa Rica, Monsignor don Esteban Lorenzo de Tristán.

According to a motion issued in the Spanish Parliament of Cádiz on 19 May 1812, the first town hall of Alajuela was founded in 1813. On 18 December of the same year, the La Lajuela quarter obtained the title of town and it was renamed. It was first called "Villa Hermosa", then it was called "San Juan Nepomuceno de Alajuela" and finally the title of city was granted on 20 November 1824 and with it the name "Alajuela" which remains today.

Participation in important historical events by citizens of Alajuela has ensured the city's reputation as a storied place in Costa Rican history. The national hero Juan Santamaría, who died during the Filibuster War in 1856 to remove invaders threatening Costa Rica's sovereignty, was born in Alajuela. This historical event is celebrated and remembered every year on 11 April and it is a national holiday.

The area often experiences earthquakes. The 2009 magnitude 6.1 earthquake caused several landslides.

Economy
The main exports of the region are coffee, sugar-cane, maize, beans, tobacco, citrus fruits, strawberries, tubers like cassava, flowers and ornamental plants. Other commercial activities include poultry farming, beekeeping, pig farming and the dairy industry. More recently, Alajuela has seen important investment in free zone parks and heavy industry companies, with a considerable number of them dedicated to manufacturing a variety of medical devices.

Transportation
Alajuela is an important transport hub for the country, connecting the capital city of San José with northwestern Costa Rica. As a part of the Greater Metropolitan Area, most of the inhabitants of Alajuela work in other cities or regions of the Central Valley, and every day receives residents from other locations to work in local factories. Central America's second busiest airport, Juan Santamaría International Airport, is three kilometers south of the district center.

Road transportation 
The district is covered by the following road routes:
 National Route 3
 National Route 123
 National Route 124
 National Route 125
 National Route 130
 National Route 153

Rail transportation 
The Interurbano Line operated by Incofer goes through this district.

Sports
Liga Deportiva Alajuelense is the province's major football club, having won 30 league titles. The club has a historical rivalry with Deportivo Saprissa, both popularly viewed as the two best football clubs of Costa Rica. They play their home games at the Estadio Alejandro Morera Soto, located in this district, and a new stadium is currently being built on another location inside the Alajuela Province.

Gallery

Sister cities

 San Bartolomé de Tirajana, Spain
 Lahr, Germany
 Montegrotto Terme, Italy
 Bordano, Italy
 Downey, California, USA
 Dothan, Alabama, USA
 Guadalajara, Mexico
 Ibaraki Prefecture, Japan
 Hangzhou, China

Notable residents

Historical
 Gregorio Jose Ramirez (1796–1823) Politician, Military Commander. 
 José María Alfaro Zamora (1799–1856) Costa Rican Head of State (1842–44, 1846–47)
 Florentino Alfaro Zamora (1805–1873) Politician
 Juan Alfaro Ruiz (1810–1856) Politician
 Jose Maria Figueroa (1820–1900) Artist. He recorded the early events of Costa Rican history in his Album de Figueroa
 Apolinar de Jesus Soto (1827–1911) Vice-President of Costa Rica (1886–1889). The title was called then Primer Designado
 Juan Santamaría (1831–1856) Costa Rican national hero. 
 Tomás Guardia Gutiérrez (1831–1882) President of Costa Rica (1870–82) Born in Bagaces, Guardia married and lived in Alajuela most of his life
 Emilia Solórzano Alfaro (1835–1914) Costa Rican First lady (1870–1882) For her activism in favor of Education and Human Rights, she was declared Benemerita de la Patria in 1972. 
 Leon Fernandez Bonilla (1840–1887) Historian, Lawyer, Diplomat, Journalist. Declared Benemerito de la Patria (Distinguished Citizen) in 1994.
 Bernardo Soto Alfaro (1854–1931) President of Costa Rica (1885–1889)
 Anastasio Alfaro (1865–1951) Zoologist, Geologist, Archeologist, Ethnologist. Creator of the Museo Nacional de Costa Rica. 
 Ricardo Fernandez Guardia (1867–1950) Historian, Author, Diplomat. Declared Benemerito de la Patria (Distinguished Citizen) in 1944.
 León Cortés Castro (1882–1946) President of Costa Rica (1936–40)
 Otilio Ulate (1891–1973) President of Costa Rica (1949–53) 
 Carlos Luis Fallas (1909–1966) Costa Rican most important author, political activist. Elected for the Congress (1944–48). Posthumously declared Benemérito de la Patria (Distinguished Citizen) in 1977.
 Alejandro Morera Soto (1909–1995) Footballer. Played with LD Alajuelense in Costa Rica, and FC Barcelona, Spain.
 Margarita Madrigal (1919–1983) Best-selling author of language textbooks.

Born in or live in Alajuela
 Fernando Durán (1939– ) Author
 Edgar Zúñiga (1950– ) Sculptor
 Jorge Arroyo (1959– ) Playwright

References

External links

 
 Municipalidad de Alajuela, December 2007
 Directorios de Costa Rica - Alajuela
 Directorio y Guía de Alajuela

 
Greater Metropolitan Area (Costa Rica)
Districts of Alajuela Province